Paulina Ayala (born June 25, 1962) is a Canadian politician who served as Member of Parliament for the riding of Honoré—Mercier from 2011 to 2015. She is a member of the New Democratic Party. She succeeded Pablo Rodriguez of the Liberal Party.

Early life and education 
She was born in Santiago, Chile, and was a leader in the student movement and in citizens' rights organizations during the Pinochet dictatorship. She later immigrated to Canada in 1995 and settled in Montreal. She earned a certificate in French as a second language and multicultural education from the Université du Québec à Montréal. She has a diploma in education, history and geography.

Political career 
Ayala was elected to represent Honoré-Mercier in the 2011 Canadian federal election. In the 2015 federal election, Pablo Rodriguez defeated Ayala in a re-match. Ayala ran in the 2018 Quebec general election in Rosemont for the provincial NDP but lost by a large margin.

Ayala contested the riding of Saint-Léonard—Saint-Michel in the 2019 federal election but lost. She again contested Honoré—Mercier at the snap 2021 election but finished fourth and her opponent for the third time, Rodriguez, easily won re-election in a landslide.

Electoral record

Federal

Provincial

References

External links

1962 births
Women members of the House of Commons of Canada
Chilean emigrants to Canada
Living people
Members of the House of Commons of Canada from Quebec
New Democratic Party MPs
People from Santiago
Politicians from Montreal
Université du Québec à Montréal alumni
Women in Quebec politics
Canadian people of Chilean descent
21st-century Canadian politicians
21st-century Canadian women politicians